Historical Figures and Ancient Heads is the eighth album by Canned Heat, released in 1971. It was the first album not to feature original member and songwriter Alan Wilson who had died the previous year, and their bassist Larry Taylor, who had left to join John Mayall's band. Featuring new guitarman Joel Scott Hill and Little Richard on "Rockin’ With the King". The record also includes Tony de la Barreda on bass, who left with Hill after this album and subsequent tour.

Track listing
"Sneakin' Around" (Jessie Mae Robinson) – 4:53
"Hill's Stomp" (Joel Scott Hill) – 3:03
"Rockin' With the King" (Skip Taylor, Richard Wayne Penniman) – 3:12
"I Don't Care What You Tell Me" (Charles Lloyd) – 3:55
"Long Way from L.A." (Jud Baker) – 3:06
"Cherokee Dance" (Robert Landers) – 4:26
"That's All Right" (Jimmy Rogers) – 5:28
"Utah" (Canned Heat) – 8:25

Personnel
Canned Heat
Bob Hite – vocals
Henry Vestine – lead guitar
Joel Scott Hill – rhythm guitar, vocals (on tracks 1 & 7), lead guitar (on track 2)
Adolfo de la Parra – drums, piano (on track 5)
Antonio de la Barreda – bass

Additional personnel
Little Richard – piano and vocals (on track 3)
Clifford Solomon – saxophone (on track 3)
Charles Lloyd – flute (on track 4)
Harvey Mandel – lead guitar (on track 7)
Ernest Lane – piano (on track 1)
Kevin Burton – organ (on track 4)
Ray Bushbaum – piano (on track 7)

Production
Produced by Skip & Jim Taylor

References

1972 albums
Canned Heat albums
United Artists Records albums